The KLCC Park (Malay: Taman KLCC) is an urban park in Kuala Lumpur City Centre, Kuala Lumpur, Malaysia. The park has been designed to provide greenery to Petronas Twin Towers and the areas surrounding it.

Design
The park was designed by Roberto Burle Marx. It is said that it was the last work undertaken by the Brazilian architect. When the park was designed, the aim was to "leave the world a little more sensitive and a little more educated to the importance of nature".

The park was designed to showcase a heritage of tropical greenery by integrating man's creation with nature. The park itself contrasts as a calm environment in the midst of the hustle and bustle of the city. The park features many combinations of man-made design such as cements, water features and also natural features such as trees, shrubs, stones and wood. Elements of shape and topography were created to give an illusion of space. The combination of trees, shrubs and sculptures were arranged to provide color and form to the park.

Conservation and bio-diversity was a major influence in the creation of the park. 23 of the mature and rarer specimens were saved from the old Selangor Turf Club and transplanted into the park grounds. 1900 indigenous trees and 66 species of palms were planted in the park to promote bio-diversity. The trees were deliberately selected to attract local and migratory birds.

A man made lake was built in the middle of the park with a 18 meter high water fountain, directly in front of Suria KLCC mall and Petronas Twin Towers towards the middle of the park. A 4.3 meter elevated bridge that cut across the lake provides a vantage view of the park and the twin towers.

Park Features

Lake Symphony
Lake Symphony is a 10,000 square meter man made lake with water fountains. The main fountain can shoot water up to a height of 280 metres. At night, there are lights, musics and fountains daily.

Jogging Track and Footpath
A 1.3 km. long jogging track is covered with EPDM, a special rubberised material for comfort and safety. Rest areas are provided along interconnecting footpaths and numbered on the local map.

Ornamental Water Features
Various waterfalls, fountains, cascade and reflecting pools are scattered around the park.

Children Playground
A children's playground with a public pool is located on the west side of the park.

Mosque
KLCC Park features the As Syakirin Mosque.

Gallery

Incidents of Crime
Three women were attacked during a mugging incident on the night of 30 June 2014.

References

Parks in Kuala Lumpur